Kacheguda–Repalle Express is an Express Train in India which runs between Kacheguda of Telangana and Repalle of Andhra Pradesh. The South Central Railway zone of the Indian Railways administers this train. Train number 17625 runs from Kacheguda to Repalle while 17626 runs from Repalle to Secunderabad Junction.

Initially this was ran as a fast passenger service, which from 19 October 2017 is upgraded to an express service.

Features

The Kacheguda–Repalle Express is usually hauled by a WDM-2/WDM-3A. The 18-coach composition contains – 5 Sleeper Class, 1 3-tier AC, 11 Unreserved and 2 SLR.

RSA 
Kacheguda–Repalle express shares the rake with 17625 -> 57652 -> 57625 -> 57657 -> 57658 -> 57626 -> 57651 -> 17626 -> 57605 -> 57606.

Coach composition 

Coach composition is historic data and may be not represent current status.
 Loco = Locomotive/Engine
 GS = General
 SL = Sleeper
 B1 = 3-tier AC

See also

 Indian Railways
 South Central Railways
 Valigonda train wreck

References

External links

Express trains in India
Rail transport in Andhra Pradesh
Rail transport in Telangana